Lobotractus valeriana, the valeriana skipper, is a species of dicot skipper in the butterfly family Hesperiidae. It is found in Central America and North America.

References

Further reading

 
 

Eudaminae
Articles created by Qbugbot
Butterflies described in 1881